Jack David Sheppard (born 29 December 1992) is an English cricketer. Sheppard is a right-handed batsman who bowls right-arm medium-fast. He was born at Salisbury, Wiltshire.

Career
Educated at Queen Elizabeth's School in Wimborne Minster, Sheppard made his way up though age-group cricket, debuting for the Hampshire Second XI in 2010. While touring Sri Lanka with the England Under-19 cricket team in early 2011, Sheppard made a single Youth One Day International appearance against Sri Lanka Under-19s. Having impressed in the Hampshire Second XI in 2012, Sheppard signed a development contract at the end of that season. Sheppard made his senior debut for Hampshire during the 2013 season in a List A match against a touring Bangladesh A team at the Rose Bowl. In a match which Hampshire won by 9 runs, Sheppard was dismissed for a duck by Rubel Hossain in Hampshire's innings of 223, while with the ball he took the wickets of Marshall Ayub and Hossain, finishing with figures of 2/49 from nine overs. Sheppard made no further appearances for Hampshire and was released by the county at the end of the 2013 season.

References

External list
Jack Sheppard at ESPNcricinfo
Jack Sheppard at CricketArchive

1992 births
Living people
Sportspeople from Salisbury
English cricketers
Hampshire cricketers